Wang Yimei (born 11 January 1988 in Dalian, Liaoning) is a Chinese volleyball player. She lives in Liaoning Province.

She played her first match for China in 2005 and has represented the national side at the Beijing 2008 Summer Olympics, where she was second leading scorer only behind the American player Logan Tom and China won the bronze medal, and also represented at the London 2012 Summer Olympics.

Awards

Individuals
 2003 Asian Junior Women's Volleyball Championship "Most valuable player"
 2008 Asian Women's Cup Volleyball Championship "Best Spiker"
 2008 Montreux Volley Masters "Best Scorer"
 2010 FIVB World Grand Prix "Best Server"
 2010 Asian Women's Cup Volleyball Championship "Most Valuable Player"
 2011 Asian Women's Volleyball Championship "Most Valuable Player"''

National team
 2005 World Grand Champions Cup -  Bronze Medal
 2005 Montreux Volley Masters -  Silver Medal

Notes

External links
Wang Yimei

1988 births
Living people
Volleyball players from Dalian
Olympic bronze medalists for China
Olympic volleyball players of China
Volleyball players at the 2008 Summer Olympics
Volleyball players at the 2012 Summer Olympics
Olympic medalists in volleyball
Medalists at the 2008 Summer Olympics
Asian Games medalists in volleyball
Volleyball players at the 2006 Asian Games
Volleyball players at the 2010 Asian Games
Chinese women's volleyball players
Asian Games gold medalists for China
Medalists at the 2006 Asian Games
Medalists at the 2010 Asian Games
Opposite hitters
Outside hitters
Eczacıbaşı volleyball players
Chinese expatriate sportspeople
Expatriate volleyball players in Turkey
21st-century Chinese women